Charlie Reynolds may refer to:
Charlie Reynolds (pitcher), Major League Baseball pitcher, played 1882
Charlie Reynolds (catcher), Major League Baseball catcher, who played in 1889
Charlie Reynolds (politician), member of the West Virginia House of Delegates in 2021

See also
Charles Reynolds (disambiguation)